Hydryphantoidea is a superfamily of mites in the  order Trombidiformes. There are about 6 families and more than 250 described species in Hydryphantoidea.

Families
These six families belong to the superfamily Hydryphantoidea:
 Ctenothyadidae
 Hydrodromidae
 Hydryphantidae
 Rhynchohydracaridae
 Teratothyadidae
 Thermacaridae

References

Further reading

External links

 

Acari
Arachnid superfamilies